Ananya Khare is an Indian television and film actress who is best known for her appearances in Bollywood films like Devdas and Chandni Bar. She won the National Film Award for Best Supporting Actress for her performance in the movie Chandni Bar.

Personal life
Khare took a break and shifted to the US in 2005 after she met her husband, David. She worked as an English teacher in a school before the couple decided to shift base back to Mumbai after 10 years.

Career
She first made her mark on television in serials including 1987's Nirmala for almost two decades before her big-screen success. She was awarded an Indian National Award for best-supporting actress for her role in Chandni Bar and subsequently nominated for her role in Devdas. She has been awarded for her roles on stage, television, and on the big screen. 

More recently, Khare has gained popularity by being back on television and mostly being cast in negative roles on popular soap operas. In 2020, Ananya played the character Benazir Abdullah in the ALTBalaji series Bekaboo.

Filmography

Films

Television

Web series

References

External links

Indian television actresses
Indian film actresses
Living people
People from Ratlam
1968 births
Actresses from Madhya Pradesh
Best Supporting Actress National Film Award winners